Swing Copters is a 2014 arcade video game released for iOS and Android on August 21, 2014. It was developed by Vietnamese video game developer .Gears, best known for Flappy Bird (2013). The player controls a character wearing a helmet with helicopter rotors, and the player changes the direction of the character by tapping the screen.

Gameplay 

The easy-to-learn-but-hard-to-master gameplay consists of the player's tapping the screen to change the direction of the character. The game has a comparable high score system and is similar to Flappy Bird, but it is even more difficult to control the rapid, horizontal movements of the protagonist. If a player touches an obstacle, the game is over.

Reception 

Swing Copters received generally "mixed or average" reviews, holding a Metacritic score of 56/100.

Sequel 
A sequel, titled Swing Copters 2, was released worldwide on December 16, 2015.

References 

2014 video games
Action video games
Android (operating system) games
Helicopter video games
Indie video games
IOS games
Single-player video games
Video games developed in Vietnam
Windows Phone games